The Kravis Center for the Performing Arts (often referred to as the Kravis Center) is a not-for-profit, professional performing arts center in downtown West Palm Beach, Florida.

History

1978–1992
In 1978, the Palm Beach County Council of the Arts was created by Alexander W. Dreyfoos Jr. The council's goals focused on the development of local arts, and sought to create a major performing arts center following the success of the Palm Beach Playhouse. In 1986, friends of Raymond F. Kravis raised a $5 million donation in his honor, beginning construction for the eventual 1992 opening. The donation, headed by Leonard Davis and Merrill Bank, grew to $10 million before 1992, and the two remain on the center's committee.

The center was built on the former site of Connie Mack Field, spring training home of the Kansas City Athletics until 1962 when it was replaced by West Palm Beach Municipal Stadium.

The grand opening was held in September 1992, a gala that included performances and speeches from Burt Reynolds, Ella Fitzgerald, Lily Tomlin, and more.

1992–present 
Since the Kravis Center's twentieth year, the facilities include four venues – the 2,195-seat Alexander W. Dreyfoos Jr. Concert Hall, the 289-seat Rinker Playhouse, and the 170-seat Helen K. Persson Hall. Additionally, the Kravis Center's facilities include the Cohen Pavilion, housing the Weiner Banquet Center and the Gimelstob Ballroom, The Elmore Family Business Center for the Arts, and The Picower Foundation Arts Education Center, which includes Persson Hall and The Khoury Family Dance Rehearsal Hall.

In March 2016, the Kravis Center became the first performing arts center in the world to install a custom-designed digital organ. The project was funded by Alexander W. Dreyfoos.

To date, the center has opened the door to the performing arts for more than 2 million school children as well as thousands of economically disadvantaged senior citizens, minorities and community groups.

On March 26, 2018, the West Palm Beach City Commission approved plans for expanding the center to be completed in summer of 2020.

Venues

The center is composed of a performance theater, black box theater and an events hall. 
Alexander W. Dreyfoos Jr. Concert Hall (Dreyfoos Hall) is a 90,000 sqft concert hall that seats over 2,000 guests. The theater opened November 1992 and serves as the main venue of the complex. 
Marshall E. Rinker Sr. Playhouse (Rinker Playhouse) is a 5,000 sqft black box theater for 300 guests. Opening in October 1994, it is frequently used for comedic performances and the residence of the MNM Theatre Company.
 Eunice and Julian Cohen Pavilion (Cohen Pavilion) is a $31 million events hall built in 2002 and opened September 2003. The building include a series of meeting rooms and rehearsal spaces, along with ballroom and recital hall. It is divided into two floors: the Weiner Banquet Hall and the Picower Foundation Arts Education Center.  
Helen K. Persson Hall is a  5,000 sqft recital hall that seats  291 guests. 
Herbert and Elaine Gimelstob Ballroom is the main gala hall for events held within the pavilion. The ballroom can seat up to 800 guests.

References

Buildings and structures in West Palm Beach, Florida
Event venues established in 1992
Concert halls in Florida
Performing arts centers in Florida
Theatres in Florida
Tourist attractions in Palm Beach County, Florida
Opera houses in Florida
1992 establishments in Florida